Tanglin is a Singaporean drama produced by Mediacorp.  Tanglin premiered on 30 June 2015 and was broadcast on Mediacorp Channel 5 at 8:30pm every weekday with a repeat at 12am and 1.30pm the next day. The series finale aired on 28 September 2018. The repeat telecast was aired  every weekday at 2pm from 8 Feb 2021 and now airs at 4pm starting 23 May 2022.

The series have started special guest appearances have been made by local celebrities like Kimberly Chia, Taufik Batisah and second generation radio disc jockey Mike Kasem.

Plot
Tanglin is a daily drama that centres on the lives of multiracial and multigenerational families – mainly the Tongs, Bhaskars, Rahmans and Lims - residents of a middle-income neighbourhood, in the Holland Village, Tanglin, Commonwealth area; their lives reflect the joys, trials and tribulations of everyday Singaporeans. In 2016, the families are entering a new chapter of their lives – from the teens moving on to National Service and University, the arrival of Norleena and Vanessa's babies, to Kwong San's life post-retirement from KS Foods. New romances blossom, while old relationships are put to the test as various fresh faces enter the lives of the Tanglin community.

Cast

The Lims

The Tongs

The Bhaskars

The Rahmans

Additional cast

Accolades

Asian Television Award

References

Singaporean television series
2015 Singaporean television series debuts
2018 Singaporean television series endings
Tanglin
Channel 5 (Singapore) original programming